Marthe Mercadier (23 October 1928 – 15 September 2021) was a French actress.

Filmography

Awards
 In 1974, she was named Ordre des Arts et des Lettres.
 In 1989, she won the Molière Award of the Best Comic Show.
 In 2007, she was named Chevalier de la Légion d'honneur.

Other
In 2011, she participated in Danse avec les stars (French version of Dancing with the Stars) and in the Balajo's anniversary, the famous night-club rue de Lappe in Paris.

In April 2014, her daughter Véronique announced her mother's Alzheimer's disease.

Dancing with the Stars
She was one of the contestants during the First season of Danse avec les stars. With her partner Grégoire Lyonnet, she finished in the 6th position.
She participated in 2011, aged 82 years old which made her the oldest participant ever, to date, in the French version of Danse Avec Les Stars.
This table shows the route of Marthe Mercadier and Grégoire Lyonnet in Danse Avec Les Stars.

References

 Biography

External links 

 
 

1928 births
2021 deaths
French film actresses
French stage actresses
French television actresses
People from Saint-Ouen-sur-Seine
20th-century French actresses
21st-century French actresses
Recipients of the Ordre des Arts et des Lettres
Chevaliers of the Légion d'honneur
Deaths from dementia in France
Deaths from Alzheimer's disease